The Reverend Richard Christian Halverson, D.D., (February 5, 1916 – November 28, 1995) was an American Presbyterian minister and author who served as the chaplain of the United States Senate.

Biography
He was born in Pingree, North Dakota. He attended Valley City State Teacher College in Valley City, North Dakota, before earning a Bachelor of Science degree from Wheaton College in Wheaton, Illinois, in 1939, participating in the Wheaton College Men's Glee Club.  He then earned a Bachelor of Theology degree from Princeton Theological Seminary. Christian educator Henrietta Mears (1890–1963) of the First Presbyterian Church of Hollywood had a significant influence on his life. He became the Assistant Pastor at First Presbyterian of Hollywood and was part of the Burning Hearts Fellowship along with Louis Evans, Jr., Bill Bright, Billy Graham, Roy Rogers and others.

Halverson was a minister of the former United Presbyterian Church in the United States of America and served from 1958 until 1981 as the Senior Pastor of the Fourth Presbyterian Church, in Bethesda, Maryland.  He served as the Chaplain of the United States Senate from February 2, 1981, until March 11, 1995. He was an associate of the National Prayer Breakfast movement starting in 1956 along with Bill Bright and Douglas Coe.  Halverson also was a member of the Board of World Vision, from 1956 to 1983, serving as chairman from 1966 to 1983. He was the President of Concern Ministries, a charitable foundation in Washington, D.C.

Halverson was married on February 2, 1942, to Doris Grace Seaton (1915-2009) and they had three children.

Awards
Halverson received the Distinguished Alumnus Award from Valley City State University on May 20, 1977, and an honorary Doctorate of Laws degree from Wheaton College. He received the Theodore Roosevelt Rough Rider Award from the state of North Dakota on March 26, 1994.

Books
Halverson authored several books in the 1950s–1990s, including:
 Christian Maturity, with foreword by Dr. Louis H. Evans, Zondervan/Cowman, 1956. Eight subsequent printings.
The quiet men: the secret to personal success and effectiveness by men who practice it, 1963
Relevance: The Role of Christianity in the Twentieth Century, 1968
A Day at a Time, 1974
Somehow inside of Eternity, January 1981
Timelessness of Jesus Christ, January 1982
Word of a Gentleman: Meditations for Modern Man, December 1983
Man to Man, January 1984
Living Fellowship, January 1986
No Greater Power: Perspective for Days of Pressure, August 1986
We the People, July 1987
Wisdom on Faith, April 1995
Wisdom on the Church, April 1995
Wisdom on America, December 1995
Wisdom on Life, December 1995

Additionally, he wrote the introduction for the following:
My Utmost for His Highest, by Oswald Chambers
Our Presbyterian Heritage, by Paul R. Carlson

References

External links
 Tribute to the Reverend Dr. Richard C. Halverson by Senator Chris Dodd
 "Halverson, Richard C." – publications listed at WorldCat

1916 births
1995 deaths
People from Stutsman County, North Dakota
Valley City State University alumni
Wheaton College (Illinois) alumni
Princeton Theological Seminary alumni
American theologians
American religious writers
United Presbyterian Church in the United States of America ministers
Chaplains of the United States Senate
20th-century American clergy